Ross Branch (born 6 May 1986) is a motorcycle racer from Botswana. He lives in Gaborone, Botswana and rode for the KTM Off-Road Racing Team until October 2018. He now represents Monster Energy 
Yamaha Racing and is the first stage winner from Botswana, after taking the stage 2 victory at the Dakar Rally 2020.

Early life 

Branch was born in Johannesburg, South Africa and his parents brought him to Jwaneng three days after he was born. Branch's parents are Kevin Branch a former Debswana employee and Glenda Branch. Branch attended Krugersdorp High School in Gauteng. Branch's love for speed and adrenaline started when he first witnessed the final stage of the 1992 Dakar Rally in Cape Town at just five years old. He started riding motorbikes at the age of ten. At 18 years old he was invited to ride on the South African colours for Motocross, giving him a taste of professional freestyle.

Career 
2020: 21st Dakar Rally, (Winner of Stage 2)

2019: 13th Dakar Rally (Best Rookie) / 2nd Merzouga Rally / 9th Morocco Rally

2018: 1st, South African OR1 Cross Country Championship / 1st, Botswana 1000 Desert Race

2017: 1st, South African OR1 Cross Country Championship / 1st, Botswana 1000 Desert Race / 1st, Khawa Dune Challenge

2016: 1st, South African OR1 Cross Country Championship / 1st, Botswana 1000 Desert Race / 1st,  African Motorcycle Union Continental Motocross Championship / Finisher, Red Bull Braveman Extreme Enduro

2015: 1st, Botswana 1000 Desert Race / 1st, Khawa Dune Challenge

2014: 1st, Botswana 1000 Desert Race / 1st, Khawa Dune Challenge

2013: 1st, Khawa Dune Challenge

2012: 1st, Botswana 1000 Desert Race

2011: Gold finisher, Roof of Africa / 1st, Botswana 1000 Desert Race / 1st, African Motorcycle Union Continental Motocross Championship

Dakar Rally

Sponsorships 
 Yamaha
 Monster Energy

Personal life 
Ross Branch has been together with Aimee Crewe-Brown since he was 20 years old and they married in 2017. They have three Jack Russells.

See also 

 Sasa Klaas
 Zeus
 Anna Mokgethi
 Charma Gal

References

External links

1986 births
Botswana people
People from Gaborone
White Botswana people
Living people
Off-road motorcycle racers
Dakar Rally motorcyclists
Dakar Rally winning drivers
Sportspeople from Johannesburg